Puraskar is a 1970 Bollywood action film. The film stars Joy Mukherjee and Farida Jalal.

Cast
Abhi Bhattacharya ...  Mr. Das / Mr. Dinanath
Joy Mukherjee ...  Rakesh
I. S. Johar ...  Sumesh
Farida Jalal ...  Reshma
Helen...  Rita
Faryal ...  No.7 / Anita
Bipin Gupta
Rajan Haksar ...  Raghu
Ram Kumar
Sapana ...  Renu Das

Plot 
Rakesh and Sumesh are two plain-clothes agents in the city's Criminal Investigations Department. They have been entrusted the task of locating a missing, believed to be abducted scientist, Mr. Das. They are assisted in this search by Renu Das, the daughter of Mr. Das. They manage to locate Mr. Das, and bring him safely to his house. His daughter is delighted to have her dad back. But then a series of odd coincidences lead Renu to conclude that her father has changed for the worse since she last saw him.

Soundtrack
Music composed by R. D. Burman, lyrics by S. H. Bihari.

External links
 

1970 films
1970s Hindi-language films
1970 action films
Films scored by R. D. Burman
Indian action films